According to Catholic theology, the sacraments of the Catholic Church can be described in their matter and form.

Description

The terminology of form and matter to describe the sacraments seems to have been first proposed by William of Auxerre. However, the Catholic Encyclopedia states this conceptual view of the sacraments was already present in Augustine of Hippo's writings.

The Catechism of the Council of Trent explains this concept this way: "every Sacrament consists of two things; 'matter,' which is called the element, and 'form,' which is commonly called 'the word.

The matter of a sacrament is "that part of a sacrament with which or to which something is done in order to confer grace", "materials used and actions performed". The form of a sacrament consists of the words and the intention by which the sacrament is effected. For example, the matter for the sacrament of baptism is water. For baptism, the matter (water) is administered to a recipient along with the form accompanying it verbally, which is in Latin is the sentence "Ego te baptizo in nomine Patris, et Filii, et Spiritus Sancti", with the person pronouncing those words doing it so with the intention of doing what the Catholic Church does.

See also
Thomistic sacramental theology
Validity and liceity (Catholic Church)
Ex opere operato

References

Further reading

Sacramental theology